Hugh Culber is a fictional character in the Star Trek franchise. He appears in the television series Star Trek: Discovery. Culber is portrayed by actor Wilson Cruz. Originally introduced as a recurring character in the first season of the series, Culber is promoted to a main character in the second season. Within Discoverys narrative, he is the ship's senior medical doctor and partner to its engineer Paul Stamets (Anthony Rapp).

Concept and casting 
In July 2016, Wilson Cruz was cast as Culber, Paul Stamets' love interest, after having previously worked with Anthony Rapp on the musical Rent. Cruz was revealed to be reprising his role of Culber for the series' second season, as well as being promoted to the main cast, on July 23, 2018. The character's appearance in the third season was confirmed in October 2019, a year before its premiere. In October 2020, just prior to the third season's premiere, Culber's role in the fourth season was confirmed, when it was announced that the series was renewed.

Characterization 
About the character in an interview about being promoted to the main cast in season two with Anthony Pascale, Cruz said: "this season for this couple [Culber and Stamets] is really about deepening them individually. We get to find out a lot about Culber–who he is, what he wants, what makes him tick, what his ambitions are–separate and apart from this relationship. But we get to learn a lot about this relationship and it is put through the test." Cruz also confirmed that the reason he was only in the recurring cast because he was in 13 Reasons Why at the same time.

Culber is one-half of the first openly gay regular character couple in a Star Trek television series. On creating the first gay couple in a Star Trek series, Cruz said he "felt like it was a long time coming ... What's great about the way that the show is handling it is it's not like we are having a special two-hour episode about gay relationships in space. It's not that. They just happen to be in love, and they happen to be coworkers. And, I hope by the time we get to [the 23rd] century that it will be exactly like that." In the season three episode "Su'Kal", Culber appears a member of the Bajoran alien race briefly in a hologram simulation.

Talking toward the fourth season, Michelle Paradise noted that Stamets and Culber would form a "really lovely" family unit with the non-binary Adira Tal, who was introduced in the previous season, and their transgender boyfriend Gray.

Fictional biography
In the first season, Culber treats Ash Tyler, who is struggling to contain his alternate Klingon personality, but is later killed by his patient. In the second season episode "Saints of Imperfection," Stamets travels into the mycelium to find a copy of Culber, and brings him back to life.

In Season 4, episode 11 “Rosetta”, Dr. Culber accepts and drinks a cup of mavi with Captain Michael Burnham. He immediately recognizes the drink upon smelling it. Mavi (also spelled “mabi”) is a local drink of Taino (Arawak) and Spanish origin from the municipality of Juana Diaz in south-central Puerto Rico, where it is still primarily brewed today (and is part of one of the two nicknames for the town: “cuidad del mavi” or “city of mavi”). This detail narrows part of the character's fictional ancestry to that particular town in the U.S. territory.

Reception 
Various publications described how the character set a precedent in both the Star Trek world and generally in media as a depiction of a gay character. In 2019, Hugh Culber was ranked the 10th-sexiest Star Trek character by Syfy.

References

External links

Fictional characters displaced in time
Fictional LGBT characters in television
Fictional lieutenant commanders
Fictional scientists in television
LGBT Star Trek characters
Star Trek: Discovery characters
Television characters introduced in 2017
Time travelers
Starfleet medical personnel
Fictional gay males